Fountain Central High School is a public high school in Veedersburg, Indiana, United States.

See also
 List of high schools in Indiana

References

External links
 

Public high schools in Indiana
Buildings and structures in Fountain County, Indiana